Martín Gusinde (29 October 1886, in Breslau – 10 October 1969, in Mödling, Austria) was an Austrian priest and ethnologist famous for his work in anthropology, particularly on the native groups of Tierra del Fuego. He was one of the most notable anthropologists in Chile in the first half of the 20th century, together with Max Uhle and Aureliano Oyarzún Navarro.

Career
In 1900, Martin Gusinde joined the missionary order Divine Word Missionaries. He began higher studies in 1905 in St. Gabriel in Mödling, near Vienna. After ordination in 1911, Gusinde went to Chile. He worked as a teacher from 1912 to the end of 1913 and subsequently at the Ethnographic Museum in Santiago de Chile with Max Uhle until 1922, becoming a head of department in 1918.

Gusinde undertook four research journeys to Tierra del Fuego between the end of 1918 and 1924. The objective was to explore the different groups of Tierra del Fuegan Indians, the Yamana and Selk'nam (also known as Ona), who had been displaced by immigrants and severely depleted by imported diseases for which they lacked natural resistance. He stayed in Tierra del Fuego for 22 months in total. He was allowed to participate in the initiation rites of the groups he studied. On behalf of the Berlin Phonogram Archive, he recorded the songs and chants of the indigenous peoples; these are the sole surviving audio recordings of the Tierra del Fuegan Indians.

In 1926 Gusinde, gained a doctorate in anthropology at the University of Vienna. Together with Frederick Hestermann, he edited and helped arrange for publication in 1933 of a Yamana-English dictionary, based on an 1879 manuscript by Rev. Thomas Bridges, an Anglican missionary at Ushuaia. This was later reprinted in Buenos Aires in 1987, and in a paperback edition in 2011.

During the mid-1930s, he studied the pygmies in the Congo.

Between 1949 and 1957, Gusinde served as a professor at The Catholic University of America in Washington, DC. He undertook an expedition to the Ayom pygmies in New Guinea in 1956. From 1959 to 1960 he taught at Nanzan University in Nagoya, Japan.

He ended his career in research, lecturing and teaching activities at the Mission St. Gabriel in Maria Enzersdorf, Vienna. Martín Gusinde died in Mödling on 10 October 1969.

Legacy
In Puerto Williams, Chile, the Martin Gusinde Anthropological Museum was erected his honour, which records his work with the Tierra del Fuego Indians. He is also honoured in the placenames, Padre Martin Gusinde street in Padre Hurtado, Santiago, Chile and Martin-Gusinde-Gasse in Maria Enzersdorf, Austria.

Decorations and awards
 1952: Karl Renner Prize
 1958: Austrian Decoration for Science and Art
 1966: Grand Silver Medal with Star for Services to the Republic of Austria
 Honorary Ring of Vienna

See also
 
 Martin Gusinde Anthropological Museum
 Tierra del Fuego#European colonization and extinction of Native Americans (1860–1910)

References

External links 
 Martin Gusinde in Memoria Chilena 
 M Gusinde. Medicina e Higiene de los araucanos Publicaciones del Museo de Etnología y Antropología de Chile. Santiago : El Museo, 1917-1927 (Santiago : Universitaria) 4 v., tomo 1, n° 3, (1917), p. 177-293 
 Martin Gusinde, Biography and Bibliography (Project: History of African Studies in Austria) by Dr. Clemens Gütl, Austria
 
 Audio recording with Martín Gusinde in the Online Archive of the Österreichische Mediathek (Interview in German). Retrieved 2 September 2019
 Peter Rohrbacher: Zwischen NS-Regime und Ordenszensur: Martin Gusinde SVD und sein Verhältnis zum Nationalsozialismus, 1938–1945 , in: Andre Gingrich; Peter Rohrbacher (Hg.), Völkerkunde zur NS-Zeit aus Wien (1938–1945): Institutionen, Biographien und Praktiken in Netzwerken (Phil.-hist. Kl., Sitzungsberichte 913; Veröffentlichungen zur Sozialanthropologie 27/3) . Wien: OEAW 2021, p. 1113–1158.

1886 births
1969 deaths
Clergy from Wrocław
Austrian ethnologists
German anthropologists
German expatriates in Chile
Austrian Roman Catholic missionaries
Catholic University of America faculty
University of Vienna alumni
Nanzan University
Recipients of the Austrian Decoration for Science and Art
Recipients of the Grand Decoration with Star for Services to the Republic of Austria
People from the Province of Silesia
History of Tierra del Fuego
German expatriates in the United States
Roman Catholic missionaries in Chile
20th-century anthropologists